Kiata is a town in the Wimmera region of western Victoria, Australia. The population at the 2011 census was 251.

The Kiata Wind Farm is located nearby.

Facilities
The only hotel in town is the Little Desert Hotel. Open for meals on Fridays and Saturdays. Kiata is also home to Inverness Motors, a museum of collectable and vintage car. The Kiata Camp Ground is located south of the town, on the edge of the Little Desert National Park.
There also a craft shop and located next door to that is the Kiata hall, now privately owned. Kiata also has 'the pines' picnic area located on the edge of the kiata flora reserve.

References

External links

Towns in Victoria (Australia)